The House of Assembly, or lower house, is one of the two chambers of the Parliament of South Australia. The other is the Legislative Council. It sits in Parliament House in the state capital, Adelaide.

Overview
The House of Assembly was created in 1857, when South Australia attained self-government. The development of an elected legislature — although only men could vote — marked a significant change from the prior system, where legislative power was in the hands of the Governor and the Legislative Council, which was appointed by the Governor.

In 1895, the House of Assembly granted women the right to vote and stand for election to the legislature. South Australia was the second place in the world to do so after New Zealand in 1893, and the first to allow women to stand for election. (The first woman candidates for the South Australia Assembly ran in 1918 general election, in Adelaide and Sturt.)

From 1857 to 1933, the House of Assembly was elected from multi-member districts, commonly known as "seats," with each district returning between one and six members. The size of the Assembly varied during this time—36 members from 1857 to 1875, 46 members from 1875 to 1884, 52 members from 1884 to 1890, 54 members from 1890 to 1902, 42 members from 1902 to 1912, 40 members from 1912 to 1915, and 46 members from 1915 to 1938. In 1938, the Assembly was reduced to 39 members, elected from single-member districts.

The House of Assembly has had 47 members since the 1970 election, elected from single-member districts: currently 34 in the Adelaide metropolitan area and 13 in rural areas. These seats are intended to represent approximately the same population in each electorate. Voting is by Instant-runoff voting and preferential voting with complete preference allocation, as with the equivalent federal chamber, the Australian House of Representatives. All members face re-election approximately every four years. The most recent election was held on 19 March 2022.

The House is presided over by a Speaker, who, as of the passage of the Constitution (Independent Speaker) Amendment Act 2021, is constitutionally banned from being a member of a registered political party outside of a "relevant election period".

Another distinctive aspect of the history of the South Australian Parliament was the "Playmander", a gerrymandering system that instituted a pro-rural electoral malapportionment introduced by the incumbent Liberal and Country League (LCL) government, and in place for 32 years from 1936 to 1968. The already entrenched rural overweighting was increased to a 2:1 ratio, the number of MPs was reduced to 39 and the multi-member seats were abandoned for single-member seats. The House of Assembly now consisted of 26 low-population rural seats, which due to population shifts, were holding up to a 10-to-1 advantage over the 13 high-population metropolitan seats, even though rural seats contained only a third of South Australia's population. At the peak of the malapportionment in 1968, the rural seat of Frome had 4,500 formal votes, while the metropolitan seat of Enfield had 42,000 formal votes.

Labor managed to win enough parliamentary seats to form government just once during the Playmander against the odds − in 1965. Labor won comprehensive majorities of the statewide two-party vote whilst failing to form government in 1944, 1953, 1962 and 1968.

More equitable boundaries were subsequently put in place following the 1968, 1975, and 1989 elections.

Most legislation is initiated in the House of Assembly. The party or coalition with a majority of seats in the lower house is invited by the Governor to form government. The leader of that party becomes Premier of South Australia, and their senior colleagues become ministers responsible for various portfolios. As Australian MPs almost always vote along party lines, almost all legislation introduced by the governing party will pass through the House of Assembly.

As with the federal parliament and Australian other states and territories, voting in the Assembly is compulsory for all those over the age of 18. Voting in the House of Assembly had originally been voluntary, but this was changed in 1942.

While South Australia's total population is 1.7 million, 1.3 million of them live in Adelaide. Over 75% of the state's population resides in the metropolitan area. As a result, Adelaide accounts for 72% (34 of 47) of the seats in the chamber. The dominance of Adelaide, combined with a lack of comparatively-sized rural population centres, results in the metropolitan area frequently deciding election outcomes. At the 2014 election for example, although the state-wide two-party vote (2PP) was 47.0% Labor v 53.0% Liberal, the metropolitan area recorded a 2PP of 51.5% Labor v 48.5% Liberal.

Election result summaries

Father of the House of Assembly since 1 Jan 1964

See also
2022 South Australian state election
List of elections in South Australia
List of South Australian state by-elections
Members of the South Australian House of Assembly
Parliaments of the Australian states and territories
South Australian Electoral Districts (for the House of Assembly)

Notes

References

Further reading

External links
House of Assembly Homepage
General Hansard Information

Parliament of South Australia
South Australia
1857 establishments in Australia